Julia Schmid (born 2 July 1988) is an Austrian slalom canoeist who has competed at the international level since 2004. Schmid has represented Hungary since 2019.

She won two bronze medals at the ICF Canoe Slalom World Championships, earning them in 2005 (K1 team) and 2015 (C1 team). She also won two silvers and a bronze at the European Championships.

Schmid was selected to represent Hungary in the Women's C1 Event at the 2020 Summer Olympics after Hungary earned the quota place on reallocation, which would've marked Hungary's Olympic canoe slalom debut. She withdrew on 19 July 2021 following the Hungarian Olympic Committee's decision to only send athletes vaccinated against COVID-19 to the Games.

References

External links

Official website

Austrian female canoeists
Living people
1988 births
Medalists at the ICF Canoe Slalom World Championships